Paul Ettore Tabone, dubbed “Australia’s own Bocelli,” is an Australia-born lyric tenor opera singer and musical theater actor. Tabone has performed at the National Opera of Bucharest in Romania, Teatro Carlo Felice in Italy, Teatro Del Giglio in Italy, and on Broadway.

Early life and career 
Paul Ettore Tabone was born in Ingham, Queensland, in Australia. He moved to Mackay, Queensland, where he graduated with Bachelor of Music Theatre in 2009 at Central Queensland University's Conservatorium of Music.

Tabone made his solo opera debut in the world premiere of Opera Queensland's The Dirty Apple. In 2011, he performed the role of “Squelch” in Love Never Dies, Andrew Lloyd Webber's sequel to the acclaimed The Phantom of The Opera. In 2012, he moved to Italy to pursue his career in opera and studied as a lyric tenor. There, he was chosen by Signora Nicoletta Mantovani, the wife of the late Luciano Pavarotti, to sing alongside Andrea Bocelli, Placido Domingo, Jose Carraras, and Ambrogio Maestri as one of the four tenors at Pavarotti's 100th year birthday celebration. He relocated to London, where he performed the role of “Ubaldo Piangi” in The Phantom of the Opera at Her Majesty's Theatre in the original production on West End in 2016. As Piangi, he performed in over 1200 performances. He performed this role until the shutdowns of the COVID-19 pandemic. He has also performed for Prince Harry and Meghan Markle.

During the COVID-19 pandemic, Tabone released his first studio album, titled This is Me. Each song on the album reflects aspects of his journey, Australian and Italian heritages, and musical influences.

Notable roles 

 Ubaldo Piangi in The Phantom of the Opera by Andrew Lloyd Webber
 Squelch in Love Never Dies by Andrew Lloyd Webber
 Duca Di Mantova in Rigoletto
 Pinkerton in Madama Butterfly
 Tony in West Side Story

References

External links 

 Spotify
Deezer

Australian tenors
21st-century Australian male opera singers
Living people
Central Queensland University alumni
1988 births
Australian male musical theatre actors